Bobby Vinton's Greatest Hits is a 12-track compilation by Bobby Vinton.  It was released in September 1964, two months after his album Tell Me Why.

By the end of summer 1964, Vinton had had eleven Billboard Top 40 hits (including three No. 1's), prompting Epic Records to compile his first greatest hits album.  With one gap left to fill on the package and his then-current single "Clinging Vine" working its way up the charts, Vinton requested that Epic round out the compilation with "Mr. Lonely" (previously featured on his debut vocal album Roses Are Red) and issue it as his next single in conjunction with the album.  This rare gambit of reissuing and promoting an older album track paid off as "Mr. Lonely" gave Vinton his fourth, albeit last, No. 1 hit on the Billboard Hot 100.

Ten of the twelve tracks were featured on Vinton's first six vocal albums.  Both charted sides of the 1963 single "Let's Kiss and Make Up"/"Trouble Is My Middle Name" make their album debut here.

The song "I Love You The Way You Are" was originally recorded in the late 50s as a demo and left unreleased. After Vinton had a hit with "Roses are Red (My Love)", Diamond Records purchased the demo and issued it as a single, reaching #38. They didn't even have another Vinton song to use as the B-side, so they put a song by Chuck and Johnny as the flip. Diamond refused to lease the single to Epic for the LP, so Epic had Vinton rerecord the song. The original hit version has never been issued on LP.

Track listing

Album credits
Produced by Bob Morgan
Cover photo by Cardell Photo of Pittsburgh

Charts
Album - Billboard (North America)

Singles - Billboard (North America)

References

1964 greatest hits albums
Bobby Vinton compilation albums
Epic Records compilation albums